Acrobasis malifoliella is a species of snout moth in the genus Acrobasis. It was described by Hiroshi Yamanaka in 2003 and is endemic to Japan.

References

Moths described in 2003
Endemic fauna of Japan
Acrobasis
Moths of Japan